Guy Forget and Yannick Noah were the defending champions, but Noah did not participate this year.  Forget partnered Loïc Courteau, losing in the semifinals.

Brad Drewett and Broderick Dyke won the title, defeating Michael Mortensen and Blaine Willenborg 3–6, 6–3, 6–4 in the final.

Seeds

  Michael Mortensen /  Blaine Willenborg (final)
  Mansour Bahrami /  Diego Pérez (first round)
  Loïc Courteau /  Guy Forget (semifinals)
  Brad Drewett /  Broderick Dyke (champions)

Draw

Draw

External links
 Draw

1988 Grand Prix (tennis)